Bimla Singh Solanki is an Indian politician and a member of the 16th Legislative Assembly of India. She represents the Sikandrabad constituency of Uttar Pradesh and is a member of the Bharatiya Janata Party political party.

Early life and  education
Bimla Singh Solanki was born in Faridabad district. She enrolled in the Maharshi Dayanand University for Bachelor of Arts course but did not complete her education. She is educated till twelfth grade.

Political career
Bimla Singh Solanki has been a MLA for one term. She represented the Sikandrabad constituency and is a member of the Bharatiya Janata Party political party.

Posts held

See also
 Sikandrabad (Assembly constituency)
 Sixteenth Legislative Assembly of Uttar Pradesh
 Uttar Pradesh Legislative Assembly

References 

Bharatiya Janata Party politicians from Uttar Pradesh
Uttar Pradesh MLAs 2012–2017
People from Bulandshahr district
1959 births
Living people
Uttar Pradesh MLAs 2017–2022
Maharshi Dayanand University